Joo Sung-Hwan (born 24 August 1990) is a South Korean footballer who plays as a striker for Ayutthaya in the Thai League 3.

External links 

1990 births
Living people
Association football defenders
South Korean footballers
Jeonnam Dragons players
K League 1 players
Korea National League players
Expatriate footballers in Thailand
Joo Sung-hwan
Joo Sung-hwan